Okyō (於京) or Okyō no kata was a Japanese female warrior (onna-musha) from the Sengoku period. She served Aso Koremitsu alongside her husband, Kiyama Masachika. When Higo province was divided between Konishi Yukinaga and Katō Kiyomasa in 1587, on the completion of the Kyushu Campaign, Kiyomasa invaded the lands of the Aso clan and she volunteered for the defense.

Okyo no Kata‘s early life is not recorded in historical registers. She was married with Kiyama Masachika (木山正親) of Higo province. Her husband was a samurai warlord who first served the Ryuzoji clan and later the Aso clan. Okyo is best known for dueling the famous samurai, Kato Kiyomasa, to a single fight.

When Masachika fell in a one-on-one duel with Katō Kiyomasa, Okyō put on Masachika's armor and challenged Kiyomasa to battle herself. However, at the last minute, her helmet got caught in the branches of a plum tree and prevented her from moving about freely, which led to her defeat. It is said that she cursed the plum tree with her dying breath, and that from then on, that tree never again bloomed or gave fruit. She died in the year of 1589.

References 

Okyō
Okyō
Okyō
Okyō
Okyō
Okyō
Okyō